English Passengers is a 2000 historical novel written by Matthew Kneale, which won that year's Whitbread Book Award and was shortlisted for the Booker Prize and the Miles Franklin Award.  It is narrated by 20 different characters and tells the story of a voyage to look for the Garden of Eden in Tasmania and the decimation of that island’s indigenous population of Aboriginal Tasmanians.

Plot summary

In 1857, after their attempts to smuggle contraband goods land them with a heavy fine from the British Customs, Captain Illiam Quillian Kewley and his crew of Manx sailors from Peel are forced to offer their ship for charter.  The vessel is quickly hired by a party of Englishmen headed by an eccentric Vicar, the Reverend Geoffrey Wilson, who believes that the Garden of Eden is located in Tasmania and wants to mount an expedition there to find it.  However, unbeknownst to the clergyman, one of his fellow travellers has an entirely different reason for journeying to the island.  Dr Thomas Potter is a renowned surgeon who is developing a thesis on the races of man and hopes to find some interesting specimens there.

Running parallel with this story, but starting some 30 or so years earlier, are the recollections of Peevay, one of Tasmania's  natives, who describes the devastating impact the white settlers had on his people, and the Aboriginal people' struggle to adapt to the cultural changes which were forced on them.

Many of the chapters alternate between the two different time periods, but when the Manx ship eventually docks in Tasmania, both strands of the story are brought together for the book's conclusion.

Reception
This "strange and wonderful book"  was very well-received. Kirkus called it "impressively knowledgeable, and very moving historical novel." A Publishers Weekly (PW) review stated, "This rich tale is told by 20 different voices skipping back and forth across the years, but somehow Kneale manages to keep the reader from becoming confused. Kneale's careful research and colorful storytelling result in an impressive epic".

English Passengers won the 2000 Whitbread Book of the Year Award and was a finalist for the Booker Prize and the Australian Miles Franklin Award. In translation, the book won France's Relay Prix d'Evasion.

References

External links
 A brief summary of the book together with points for discussion

2000 British novels
Historical novels
Novels by Matthew Kneale
Costa Book Award-winning works
Novels set in Tasmania
Novels set in the 1850s
Fiction set in 1857
Hamish Hamilton books